Fredrik Andersson (born 25 October 1988) is a Swedish footballer who plays as a goalkeeper for Varbergs BoIS.

Club career
Andersson started his senior career at his youth club Skene IF. After just one season with the senior team he moved to Division 1 club Örgryte IS. He served as a back-up for three seasons before he became a regular starter in 2014. After an impressive year-and-a-half as the first choice goalkeeper he was signed by reigning Swedish Champions Malmö FF on 27 July 2015. On 26 October 2016 Andersson made his first team debut for Malmö FF when he replaced an injured Johan Wiland with 13 minutes to go of the title decider against Falkenbergs FF. Malmö were in the lead by 3–0 at that point, which was also the final score of the game.

Honours
Malmö FF
 Allsvenskan: 2016

References

External links
 Malmö FF profile  
 
 

1988 births
Living people
Swedish footballers
Varbergs BoIS players
Örgryte IS players
Malmö FF players
Allsvenskan players
People from Mark Municipality
Association football goalkeepers
Sportspeople from Västra Götaland County